The  Denver Broncos season was the team's 33rd year in professional football and its 23rd with the National Football League (NFL). Overall, this team finished with an 8-8 record and did not make the playoffs. It was also head coach Dan Reeves' twelfth and final season as head coach. He was fired and replaced by Wade Phillips the following season.

Offseason

NFL Draft

Staff

Roster

Schedule

Note: Intra-division opponents are in bold text.

Standings

References

External links
Denver Broncos – 1992 media guide
 1992 Denver Broncos on Pro-Football-Reference.com

Denver Broncos
Denver Broncos seasons
Bronco